Dent is an unincorporated community in Texas County, in the U.S. state of Missouri.

History
A post office called Dent was established in 1900, and remained in operation until 1933. The community has the name of the local Dent family.

References

Unincorporated communities in Texas County, Missouri
Unincorporated communities in Missouri